Elections to Falkirk Council were held on 3 May 2012, the same day as the 31 other local authorities in Scotland. The election used the nine wards created under the Local Governance (Scotland) Act 2004, with 32 councillors being elected. Each ward elected either 3 or 4 members, using the STV electoral system.

The election saw Labour remain the largest party on the Council despite being outpolled in terms of votes by the Scottish National Party. The Scottish Conservative and Unionist Party saw their vote share fall but held their Council seats and Independents returned 3 seats as they did in the 2007 Local Elections.

Following the election, the controlling administration consists of 14 Labour members, 2 Conservative and 1 Independent (Cllr Buchanan). Opposition is 13 SNP members and 2 Independent (Cllrs Spears and McCabe). The Council Leader is Cllr Craig C Martin, Provost is Cllr Reid and the Depute Provost Cllr Patrick.

Election result

Note: "Votes" are the first preference votes. The net gain/loss and percentage changes relate to the result of the previous Scottish local elections on 3 May 2007. This may differ from other published sources showing gain/loss relative to seats held at dissolution of Scotland's councils.

Ward results

Bo'ness and Blackness
2007: 2xSNP; 1xLab
2012: 2xSNP; 1xLab
2007-2012 Change: No change

Grangemouth
2007: 2xLab; 1xSNP; 1xIndependent
2012: 2xLab; 1xSNP; 1xIndependent
2007-2012 Change: No change

Denny and Banknock
2007: 2xSNP; 1xLab; 1xIndependent
2012: 2xSNP; 1xLab; 1xIndependent
2007-2012 Change: No change

Carse, Kinnaird & Tryst
2007: 2xLab; 2xSNP
2012: 2xLab; 2xSNP
2007-2012 Change: No change

Bonnybridge and Larbert
2007: 1xSNP; 1xIndependent; 1xLab
2012: 1xSNP; 1xLab; 1xIndependent
2007-2012 Change: No change

 

 Sitting Councillor from a different ward.

Falkirk North
2007: 2xLab; 2xSNP
2012: 2xSNP; 2xLab
2007-2012 Change: No change

Falkirk South
2007: 2xLab; 1xSNP; 1xCon
2012: 2xLab; 1xSNP; 1xCon
2007-2012 Change: No change

Lower Braes
2007: 1xCon; 1xSNP; 1xLab
2012: 1xCon; 1xSNP; 1xLab
2007-2012 Change: No change

Upper Braes
2007: 2xLab; 1xSNP
2012: 2xLab; 1xSNP
2007-2012 Change: No change

References 

Scottish Local Government Elections 2012

Post-Election Changes
† Denny and Banknock SNP Cllr John McNally was elected as an MP for Falkirk on 7 May 2015. He resigned his Council seat in June and a by-election was held on 13 August 2015 which was held by the SNP's Paul Garner.

By-elections since 2012

2012
2012 Scottish local elections